Apatheia (from a- "without" and pathos "suffering" or "passion"), in Stoicism, refers to a state of mind in which one is not disturbed by the passions. It might better be translated by the word equanimity than the word indifference. The meaning of the word apatheia is quite different from that of the modern English apathy, which has a distinctly negative connotation. According to the Stoics, apatheia was the quality that characterized the sage.

Whereas Aristotle had claimed that virtue was to be found in the golden mean between an excess and a deficiency of emotion (metriopatheia), the Stoics thought that living virtuously provided freedom from the passions, resulting in apatheia. It meant eradicating the tendency to react emotionally or egotistically to external events, the things that cannot be controlled. For Stoics, it was the optimally rational response to the world, for things cannot be controlled if they are caused by the will of others or by Nature; only one's own will can be controlled. That did not mean a loss of feeling, or total disengagement from the world. The Stoic who performs correct (virtuous) judgments and actions as part of the world order experiences contentment (eudaimonia) and good feelings (eupatheia).

The term was later adopted by Plotinus in his development of Neoplatonism, in which apatheia was the soul's freedom from emotion achieved when it reaches its purified state. It passed into early Christian teaching in which apatheia meant freedom from unruly urges or compulsions. It is still used in that sense in Orthodox Christian spirituality, and especially in monastic practice.

Apatheia is contrasted with ataraxia, a related concept in Epicureanism and Pyrrhonism, although some Latin Stoic authors, such as Seneca the Younger use the term interchangeably with apatheia. In Epicureanism ataraxia comes from freedom from pain and fear. In Pyrrhonism it comes from the eradication of disturbing feelings that depend on beliefs about non-evident matters (i.e., dogma).

See also 

 Hesychia, or stillness
 Detachment, a related concept in Ignatian spirituality
 Nirvana, a similar unconditioned state described in Buddhism
 Upekkha, a related concept described in Buddhism
 Vairagya, a related concept in Hindu philosophy.

Notes

References
 Richard Sorabji, (2002), Emotion and Peace of Mind: From Stoic Agitation to Christian Temptation, Oxford University Press 

Concepts in ancient Greek ethics
Concepts in ancient Greek philosophy of mind
Stoicism
Theories in ancient Greek philosophy